Version 7.0: The Street Scriptures is the fifth studio album by American hip hop recording artist Guru formerly of the group Gang Starr.

Doo Wop, Styles P, Jaguar Wright, Jean Grae, Talib Kweli and B-Real appear on this album. The Greek version features verses from the Greek rapper Εισβολέας (Invader) for 33⅓ Entertainment.
The track "Cave In" was featured in the 2005 racing video game Juiced.

Track listing
 "No Time" – 3:12
 "False Prophets" – 3:07
 "Step in the Arena 2 (I'm Sayin’)" (featuring Doo Wop) – 2:35
 "Don Status" (featuring Styles P) – 2:52
 "Hood Dreamin" – 2:16
 "Cave In" – 1:58
 "Surviving the Game" – 2:33
 "Hall of Fame" – 3:51
 "Talk to Me" (featuring Jaguar Wright) – 4:11
 "Too Dark See" – 3:09
 "Power, Money and Influence" (featuring Jean Grae and Talib Kweli) – 4:12
 "Kingpin" – 3:07
 "Fa Keeps" – 3:26
 "Real Life" (featuring B-Real) – 2:47
 "Feed the Hungry" – 3:04
 "Talkin' Loud and Frontin'" – 2:53
 "Open House" – 3:04
 "I Gotta..." – 2:47
 "What's My Life Like?" – 4:27

Production 
All tracks produced by Solar and Guru.

Charts

References 

2005 albums
Guru (rapper) albums
Albums produced by Guru